"1984" is an American television commercial that introduced the Apple Macintosh personal computer. It was conceived by Steve Hayden, Brent Thomas and Lee Clow at Chiat/Day, produced by New York production company Fairbanks Films, and directed by Ridley Scott. English athlete Anya Major performed as the unnamed heroine and David Graham as Big Brother. In the US, it first aired in 10 local outlets, including Twin Falls, Idaho, where Chiat/Day ran the ad on December 31, 1983, at the last possible break before midnight on KMVT, so that the advertisement qualified for the 1984 Clio Awards. Its second televised airing, and only US national airing, was on January 22, 1984, during a break in the third quarter of the telecast of Super Bowl XVIII by CBS.

In one interpretation of the commercial, "1984" used the unnamed heroine to represent the coming of the Macintosh (indicated by her white tank top with a stylized line drawing of Apple’s Macintosh computer on it) as a means of saving humanity from "conformity" (Big Brother). These images were an allusion to George Orwell's noted 1949 novel, Nineteen Eighty-Four, which described a dystopian future ruled by a televised "Big Brother".  The estate of George Orwell and the television rightsholder to the novel Nineteen Eighty-Four considered the commercial to be a copyright infringement and sent a cease-and-desist letter to Apple and Chiat/Day in April 1984.

Originally a subject of contention within Apple, it has subsequently been called a watershed event and a masterpiece in advertising. In 1995, The Clio Awards added it to its Hall of Fame, and Advertising Age placed it on the top of its list of 50 greatest commercials.

In January 1984, Apple also launched the inventé advertisement for Macintosh in France.

Plot
The commercial opens with a dystopian, industrial setting in blue and grayish tones, showing a line of people marching in unison through a long tunnel monitored by a string of telescreens. This is in sharp contrast to the full-color shots of the nameless runner (Anya Major). She looks like a competitive track and field athlete, wearing an athletic "uniform" (red athletic shorts, running shoes, a white tank top with a cubist picture of Apple's Macintosh computer, a white sweat band on her left wrist, and a red one on her right), and is carrying a large brass-headed sledgehammer. Rows of marching minions evoke the opening scenes of Metropolis.

As she is chased by four police officers (presumably agents of the Thought Police) wearing black uniforms, protected by riot gear, helmets with visors covering their faces, and armed with large night sticks, she races towards a large screen with the image of a Big Brother-like figure (David Graham, also seen on the telescreens earlier) giving a speech:

The runner, now close to the screen, hurls the hammer towards it, right at the moment Big Brother announces, “we shall prevail!” In a flurry of light and smoke, the screen is destroyed, leaving the audience in shock.

The commercial concludes with a portentous voiceover by actor Edward Grover, accompanied by scrolling black text (in Apple's early signature "Garamond" typeface); the hazy, whitish-blue aftermath of the cataclysmic event serves as the background. It reads:

The screen fades to black as the voiceover ends, and the rainbow Apple logo appears.

Production

Development

The commercial was created by the advertising agency Chiat/Day, of Venice, California, with copy by Steve Hayden, art direction by Brent Thomas, and creative direction by Lee Clow.  The commercial "grew out of an abandoned print campaign" with a specific theme:

Ridley Scott (whose dystopian sci-fi film Blade Runner had been released one and a half years prior) was hired by agency producer Richard O'Neill to direct it. Less than two months after the Super Bowl airing, The New York Times reported that Scott "filmed it in England for about $370,000"; In 2005 writer Ted Friedman said the commercial had a then-"unheard-of production budget of $900,000."
The actors who appeared in the commercial were paid $25 per day. Scott later admitted that he accepted brutal budget constraints because he believed in the ad's concept, outlining how the total cost was less than $250,000 and that he used local skinheads to portray the broken, pale "drones" in the commercial.

Steve Jobs and John Sculley were so enthusiastic about the final product that they "...purchased one and a half minutes of ad time for the Super Bowl, annually the most-watched television program in America. In December 1983 they screened the commercial for the Apple Board of Directors. To Jobs' and Sculley's surprise, the entire board hated the commercial." However, Sculley himself got "cold feet" and asked Chiat/Day to sell off the two commercial spots.

Despite the board's dislike of the film, Steve Wozniak and others at Apple showed copies to friends, and he offered to pay for half of the spot personally if Jobs paid the other half. This turned out to be unnecessary. Of the original ninety seconds booked, Chiat/Day resold thirty seconds to another advertiser, then claimed they could not sell the other 60 seconds, when in fact they did not even try.

Intended message
In his 1983 Apple keynote address, Steve Jobs read the following story before showcasing a preview of the commercial:

In March 1984 Michael Tyler, a communications expert quoted by The New York Times, said "The Apple ad expresses a potential of small computers. This potential may not automatically flow from the company's product. But if enough people held a shared intent, grass-roots electronic bulletin boards (through which computer users share messages) might result in better balancing of political power."

In 2004, Adelia Cellini writing for Macworld, summarized the message:

Reception and legacy

Art director Brent Thomas said Apple "had wanted something to 'stop America in its tracks, to make people think about computers, to make them think about Macintosh.' With about $3.5 million worth of Macintoshes sold just after the advertisement ran, Thomas judged the effort 'absolutely successful.' 'We also set out to smash the old canard that the computer will enslave us,' he said. 'We did not say the computer will set us free—I have no idea how it will work out. This was strictly a marketing position.'"

Awards
1984: Clio Awards
1984: 31st Cannes Lions International Advertising Festival—Grand Prix
1995: Clio Awards—Hall of Fame
1995: Advertising Age—Greatest Commercial
1999: TV Guide—Number One Greatest Commercial of All Time
2003: WFA—Hall of Fame Award (Jubilee Golden Award)
2007: Best Super Bowl Spot (in the game's 40-year history)

It ranked at number 38 in Channel 4's 2000 list of the "100 Greatest TV Ads".

Social impact
Ted Friedman, in his 2005 text, Electric Dreams: Computers in American Culture, notes the impact of the commercial:

Super Bowl viewers were overwhelmed by the startling ad. The ad garnered millions of dollars worth of free publicity, as news programs rebroadcast it that night. It was quickly hailed by many in the advertising industry as a masterwork. Advertising Age named it the 1980s Commercial of the Decade, and it continues to rank high on lists of the most influential commercials of all time [...] '1984' was never broadcast again, adding to its mystique.

The "1984" ad became a signature representation of Apple computers. It was scripted as a thematic element in the 1999 docudrama, Pirates of Silicon Valley, which explores the rise of Apple and Microsoft (the film opens and closes with references to the commercial, including a re-enactment of the heroine running towards the screen of Big Brother and clips of the original commercial).

The commercial was also prominent in the 20th anniversary celebration of the Macintosh in 2004, as Apple reposted a new version of the ad on its website and showed it during Jobs's Keynote Address at Macworld Expo in San Francisco, California. In this updated version, an iPod, complete with signature white earbuds, was digitally added to the heroine. Keynote Attendees were given a poster showing the heroine with an iPod as a commemorative gift. And the ad has also been cited as the turning point for Super Bowl commercials, which had been important and popular before (especially with the Coca-Cola ad featuring Joe Greene from years earlier) but after "1984" those ads became the most expensive, creative and influential advertising set for all television coverage.

Revisiting the commercial in Harper's Magazine thirty years after it aired, social critic Rebecca Solnit suggested that "1984" did not so much herald a new era of liberation as a new era of oppression. In the December 2014 issue of the magazine, she wrote:

Media archivist (and early Apple supporter) Marion Stokes recorded said Super Bowl featuring the legendary ad, which was also featured in the 2019 documentary film Recorder: The Marion Stokes Project.

Parodies
In March 2007, the advertisement attracted attention again when Hillary 1984, a video mashup of the original commercial with footage of Hillary Clinton used in place of Big Brother, went viral in the early stages of the campaign for the 2008 Democratic presidential nomination. The video was produced in support of Barack Obama by Phil de Vellis, an employee of Blue State Digital, but was made without the knowledge of either Obama's campaign or his own employer. De Vellis stated that he made the video in one afternoon at home using a Mac and some software. Political commentators including Carla Marinucci and Arianna Huffington, as well as de Vellis himself, suggested that the video demonstrated the way technology had created new opportunities for individuals to make an impact on politics.

The 2008 The Simpsons episode MyPods and Boomsticks parodies Apple.
In it Comic Book Guy throws a sledgehammer at a giant screen that displays the CEO "Steve Mobs".

In May 2010, Valve released a short video announcing the release of Half-Life 2 on OS X featuring a recreation of the original commercial, with the people replaced with City 17's citizens, Big Brother with a speech from Wallace Breen, the agents of the Thought Police with Combine Soldiers, and the nameless runner with Alyx Vance.

In the 2016 The Simpsons episode The Last Traction Hero, Lisa Simpson is a bus monitor and fantasizes about being on a big screen controlling the bus children with Bart Simpson as the runner with the hammer. 

On August 13, 2020, Apple removed Fortnite from the App Store after Epic Games introduced a direct payment option that circumvented Apple's 30% revenue cut policy, violating terms of service policies. In response, Epic filed a lawsuit against Apple, and created a parody of the "1984" ad called "Nineteen Eighty-Fortnite". In the ad, Big Brother is replaced by a personification of the Apple logo (Tart Tycoon) addressing an audience of Fortnites default outfits, with the character Brite Bomber acting as the heroine.

On August 26, 2022, South Korean girl group TWICE parodied the advertisement in their music video Talk That Talk.

See also

Lemmings (advertisement), the follow-up advert
Think Different, an Apple advertising slogan
Get a Mac, television advertising campaign
List of Super Bowl commercials

References

Further reading

External links

Super Bowl commercials
American television commercials
1980s television commercials
Apple Inc. advertising
Films based on Nineteen Eighty-Four
Films directed by Ridley Scott
History of computing
1983 television films
1983 films
1983 short films
1984 in American television